Vendetta is a 2017 pornographic film written and directed by Stormy Daniels. The film released which was released on April 12, 2017 and distributed by Wicked Pictures.

The film which was written, directed and starred in by Stormy Daniels and saw massive attention due to the Stormy Daniels–Donald Trump scandal. After the film was announced by Wicked Pictures in March 2017 and its release in April 2017 sales struggled. Until a year later in April 2018 due to the scandal DVD and digital download sales skyrocketed. DVD sales number are not known however Wicked Pictures released the digital download numbers were over 65,000. Daniels' scene alone saw over 20,000 downloads.

Synopsis 
After an accident leaves Celeste's wealthy husband confined to a wheelchair, she must find other ways to keep herself satisfied. Soon he begins to suspect her infidelity and hires a private investigator. With his suspicions confirmed, Celeste soon finds herself in danger. But she is not one to back down. Her husband discovers his sweet wife is really a woman with a vendetta.

Scene breakdown 
Scene 1: Asa Akira, Kleio Valentien, Stormy Daniels – lesbian three-way; 16 minutes

Scene 2: Kenzie Taylor, Lucas Frost – blowjob, vaginal, cumshot facial; 12 minutes

Scene 3: Stormy Daniels, Brendon Miller – blowjob, vaginal, anal, cumshot facial; 18 minutes

Scene 4: Asa Akira, Marcus London – blowjob and cumshot facial; 24 minutes

Scene 5: Kimber Woods, Michael Vegas – blowjob, vaginal, cumshot; 19 minutes

Cast

Reception 
The release saw mostly positive reviews from critics. Adult DVD Talk reviewed the film saying: "This had a surprise ending that was executed nicely. As for the sexual escapades, it was a fun release and I think Kimber Woods is going to be a superstar! Asa Akira is always incredible and Stormy does a great job with the anal. I only wish the lighting had been better in the opening scene. Decent couples release!"

XCritic said "This film is well thought out and creative. I can imagine Stormy Daniels developing this script and putting her "Stormy" spin on it to always have the viewers wondering what she is up to. She never gives too much too soon. There are very good acting performances by Stormy, Asa Akira, and Kyle Stone. The sex is pretty hot and passionate. It was nice to see Stormy ride her horse and jump over the obstacle since horses and equestrian are a big love in her life. I highly recommend Vendetta."

Awards

References

External links 
 

2017 films
2010s pornographic films
2010s English-language films